Keppel is an electoral district in the state of Queensland, Australia.

The electoral district encompasses the central Queensland coast from the mouth of the Fitzroy River in the south to Shoalwater Bay to the north. Major communities located within this electorate include Yeppoon, Emu Park, Byfield and the Rockhampton suburbs of Parkhurst and Lakes Creek.

Members for Keppel

Election results

References

External links
 

Keppel